Entex may refer to:

 Entex Industries, a defunct toy and electronic game manufacturer
 Entex Adventure Vision, a self-contained cartridge-based video game console
 Entex Select-A-Game, a handheld game system
 Entex Energy, an oil and gas firm; now CenterPoint Energy
 Entex Building (disambiguation), multiple uses
 Fenthion, sold under the trade name Entex
 Guaifenesin/phenylephrine, trade name Entex, a cold medicine